The SOLIDAC (Solid-state Automatic Computer) was a 50kHz mini-computer at Glasgow University, built by Barr & Stroud in the late 1950s; Some early computer music was created on the system.

References

External links
 Studio für Elektronische Musik
 Short paper by designer P.A.V Thomas

1950s computers
Early British computers
Transistorized computers
Computer-related introductions in 1959